The respiratory exchange ratio (RER) is the ratio between the metabolic production of carbon dioxide (CO2) and the uptake of oxygen (O2).

The ratio is determined by comparing exhaled gases to room air. Measuring this ratio can be used for estimating the respiratory quotient (RQ), an indicator of which fuel (e.g. carbohydrate or fat) is being metabolized to supply the body with energy. Using RER to estimate RQ is only accurate during rest and mild to moderate aerobic exercise without the accumulation of lactate. The loss of accuracy during more intense anaerobic exercise is among others due to factors including the bicarbonate buffer system. The body tries to compensate for the accumulation of lactate and minimize the acidification of the blood by expelling more CO2 through the respiratory system.

An RER near 0.7 indicates that fat is the predominant fuel source, a value of 1.0 is indicative of carbohydrate being the predominant fuel source, and a value between 0.7 and 1.0 suggests a mix of both fat and carbohydrate. In general a mixed diet corresponds with an RER of approximately 0.8. The RER can also exceed 1.0 during intense exercise. A value above 1.0 cannot be attributed to the substrate metabolism, but rather to the aforementioned factors regarding bicarbonate buffering. 

Calculation of RER is commonly done in conjunction with exercise tests such as the VO2 max test. This can be used as an indicator that the participants are nearing exhaustion and the limits of their cardio-respiratory system. An RER greater than or equal to 1.0 is often used as a secondary endpoint criterion of a VO2 max test.

Oxidation of a carbohydrate molecule:

 
 

Oxidation of a fatty acid molecule, namely palmitic acid:

See also

References

Respiration
Ratios